Yamuna Bridge railway station is on the Tundla–Agra branch line.  It is located in Agra district in the Indian state of Uttar Pradesh. It serves Etmaddoula and surrounding neighbourhoods in Agra.

Overview
Agra, the 16–17th century capital of the Mughals, is home to monuments such as the Taj Mahal and Agra Fort. The Taj Mahal attracts 7-8 million tourists annually. About 0.8 million foreign tourists visit it.

Trains 
 Bareilly–Bandikui Passenger
 Agra–Tundla MEMU
 Etawah–Agra Cantonment MEMU
 Yamuna Bridge–Bayana Passenger
 Tundla–Agra Cantonment MEMU
 Haldighati Passenger
 Bandikui–Bareilly Passenger
 Agra Fort–Lucknow Junction Intercity Superfast
 Lucknow Junction–Agra Fort Intercity Superfast

Electrification
Tundla–Yamuna Bridge section was electrified in 1998–99 and Yamuna Bridge–Agra in 1990–91.

References

External links
 Trains at Yamuna Bridge

Railway stations in Agra
Agra railway division